Parotis squamopedalis is a moth in the family Crambidae. It was described by Achille Guenée in 1854. It is found in Western Cape, South Africa.

References

Endemic moths of South Africa
Moths described in 1854
Spilomelinae